The twelfth series of the Australian cooking game show MasterChef Australia, also known as MasterChef Australia: Back To Win, premiered on 13 April 2020. It is the first series to feature series four winner Andy Allen, Melissa Leong and Jock Zonfrillo serving as judges, after the departure of Gary Mehigan, George Calombaris and Matt Preston in the previous season. This series involves former high-achieving contestants from the past eleven series of MasterChef Australia, returning for another chance at the title of 'MasterChef' and a prize of A$250,000.

Applications for contestants for the twelfth series of MasterChef Australia opened in May 2019. However, plans were changed when contestants from previous seasons were brought onboard instead of new contestants.

The competition was won by Emelia Jackson in the grand finale against Laura Sharrad, broadcast on 20 July 2020.

Changes
Gary Mehigan, George Calombaris and Matt Preston departed the show in 2019 and were replaced with new judges Andy Allen, Melissa Leong and Jock Zonfrillo.

In this series, the typical MasterChef weekly format was slightly changed from prior series. Mondays now feature a Team Challenge with the losing team facing Tuesday's Pressure Test elimination. Wednesdays feature a Mystery Box with the best cooks competing in the Immunity Challenge on Thursday, in which one contestant will be granted immunity from the upcoming elimination. All the other contestants then head into the All-In Elimination Challenge on Sunday. In addition, only one Immunity Pin was up for grabs this season; it was awarded to Dani Venn in the first episode of the series. A new format schedule was debuted on 14 June, with the show beginning to air only three nights a week. Mondays featured the Mystery Box, Tuesdays featured the Immunity Challenge, and Sundays featured the All-In Elimination Challenge.

Amidst the COVID-19 pandemic, production of the show continued while following government regulations. This includes the observance of social distancing, having individual plates for each judge during tasting, and the use of gloves when handling ingredients. In addition, the number of crew on set has been reduced by half, and outside challenges and guests have been dialled back. The new measures debuted on 25 May 2020.

Unlike previous seasons, there was no mid-way "second chance" return challenge for eliminated contestants; all eliminated contestants had no chance to return to the season.

Contestants
The 24 returning contestants were announced on 19 February 2020. Other past contestants such as Derek Lau, Sarah Todd, and Alvin Quah were later confirmed to have been invited to compete in the series, but refused for various reasons.

In March 2020, Ben Ungermann suddenly left the series after being arrested in a matter unrelated to the show. His departure was announced on 17 May 2020. Most charges were dropped when Ungermann pleaded guilty to a single count of common law assault, avoiding a criminal conviction.

Notes
Future Appearances

 Emelia Jackson appeared on the 3rd Junior Series as a guest judge for a Mystery Box Challenge.
 Emelia appeared on the following season as a guest judge for the first Mystery Box challenge. Reynold Poernomo, Callum Hann and Poh Ling Yeow appeared later on as guest judges for an elimination challenge. Laura Sharrad appeared for the first Masterclass as a guest chef.
 Reynold also appeared on Series 14 as a guest judge for a pressure test.

Allegations of favouritism from viewers 
Despite the largely positive overall reception, the series has been met with some skepticism from viewers, mostly through social media, concerning the judges' apparent favouritism towards certain contestants. The most prominent instance of this has centered around contestant Laura Sharrad, who worked in judge Jock Zonfrillo's restaurant for two years following her Series 6 appearance, thus sparking concerns that Zonfrillo may therefore be biased towards her. Other criticism has focused largely on Laura's supposed tendency to cook pasta dishes repeatedly, despite the fact that less than half her dishes could be classified as such. The judges' decision to award Weekly Immunity to Laura, rather than Poh, in Episode 50, was met with backlash from viewers, who felt that Poh's effort was evidently superior. Laura spoke out about her controversy, citing the numerous non-pasta dishes she has cooked on the show and claiming that having to cook for her former employer has made the competition harder, rather than easier, for her. Emelia Jackson called the online hate "narrow-minded".

Other accusations have attacked the judges' apparent reluctance to eliminate contestants Poh Ling Yeow and Reynold Poernomo, both of whom are considered fan favourites, and, therefore, beneficial to the show's viewership. Notably, contestant Tessa Boersma’s elimination stirred controversy and prompted allegations of bias towards Reynold. On the other hand, fans of Reynold called the finale "rigged" because Reynold was not in it.

Guests

Elimination chart

Episodes and ratings
 Colour key:
  – Highest rating during the series
  – Lowest rating during the series

References

External links
 Official Website

MasterChef Australia
2020 Australian television seasons
Television series impacted by the COVID-19 pandemic